The  (NACS-J) is a Japanese NGO founded in 1951. It is a member organization of the International Union for Conservation of Nature, for which it acts as the Japanese coordinator. More recent initiatives have included the development of a citizen-led satoyama monitoring system.

See also
 Oze National Park
 Wildlife Protection Areas in Japan
 Wild Bird Society of Japan

References

External links
  Nature Conservation Society of Japan
  Nature Conservation Society of Japan
  The Nature Conservation Movement in Post-War Japan

Environmental organizations based in Japan
1951 establishments in Japan